The canton of Ardentes is an administrative division of the Indre department, central France. Its borders were modified at the French canton reorganisation which came into effect in March 2015. Its seat is in Ardentes.

It consists of the following communes:
 
Ambrault
Ardentes
Arthon
Diors
Étrechet
Jeu-les-Bois
Mâron
Montierchaume
Le Poinçonnet
Sainte-Fauste
Sassierges-Saint-Germain
Vouillon

References

Cantons of Indre